The  is a national expressway in Japan. It is owned and operated by East Nippon Expressway Company.

Naming
 is a kanji acronym consisting of 3 characters, each representing the former names of the prefectures that the route traverses.  consists of present-day Gunma Prefecture,  consists of present-day Nagano Prefecture, and  consists of present-day Niigata Prefecture.

Officially, the expressway is referred to as the Kan-Etsu Expressway Jōetsu Route. This designation consists of the entire Jōshin-etsu Expressway as well as the Kan-Etsu Expressway beyond Fujioka Junction to Nerima Interchange (concurrent with the Kan-Etsu Expressway Niigata Route).

Route description

The expressway begins at a junction with the Kan-Etsu Expressway in southern Gunma Prefecture and heads west, paralleling National Route 254 until Shimonita. From here the route branches north, passing Mount Myōgi, then heads west once more from Annaka. The route parallels National Route 18 from this point until the terminus. The expressway then follows a winding route through the mountainous area separating Gunma and Nagano Prefectures. From Saku, Nagano the route follows a northwesterly course, passing Mount Asama, until it reaches a junction with the Nagano Expressway near the city of Nagano. The route then heads north, following the east bank of the Chikuma River, before heading into the mountainous region separating Nagano and Niigata Prefectures. The expressway continues north through Niigata Prefecture, passing Mount Myōkō, and eventually terminating at a junction with the Hokuriku Expressway in Jōetsu near the Japan Sea coastline.

The expressway is 6 lanes from Fujioka Junction to Fujioka Interchange. The remaining section from Fujioka Interchange to Jōetsu Junction is 4 lanes, from 5 December 2019 according to E-NEXCO.

History
The first section was completed in 1980 and the entire route was completed in 1999. On the night of 16 December 2020, about 300 vehicles were trapped on the expressway after a truck blocked it off due to it becoming stuck in the snow. In response, the company that manages the route supplied drivers who were stuck on the road until the next morning.

List of interchanges and features

 IC - interchange, SIC - smart interchange, JCT - junction, SA - service area, PA - parking area, BS - bus stop, CB - snow chains, TN - tunnel, BR - bridge

There are also 2 snow chain changing areas between Toyota-Iiyama Interchange and Kurohime-Nojiriko Parking Area, and 1 area between Sakaki Interchange and Ueda-Sugadaira Interchange (Fujioka-bound only).

References

External links 

 East Nippon Expressway Company
 JAF Drive Map

Expressways in Japan
Roads in Gunma Prefecture
Roads in Nagano Prefecture
Roads in Niigata Prefecture